Judith Durham  (born Judith Mavis Cock; 3 July 1943 – 5 August 2022) was an Australian singer, songwriter and musician who became the lead singer of the Australian folk music group The Seekers in 1963.

The group became the first Australian pop music group to achieve major chart and sales success in the United Kingdom and the United States and have sold over 50 million records worldwide. Durham left the group in mid-1968 to pursue her solo career. In 1993, Durham began to make sporadic recordings and performances with The Seekers, though she remained primarily a solo performer. On 1 July 2015, she was named Victorian of the Year for her services to music and a range of charities.

Early life
Durham was born Judith Mavis Cock on 3 July 1943 in Essendon, Victoria, to William Alexander Cock, a navigator and World War II pathfinder, and his wife, Hazel (née Durham). From her birth until 1949, she lived on Mount Alexander Road, Essendon.She spent summer holidays at her family's weatherboard house (which since has been demolished) on the west side of Durham Place in Rosebud.

Her father accepted work in Hobart, Tasmania, in 1949. From early 1950, the family lived in Taroona, a suburb of Hobart, where Durham attended the Fahan School before moving back to Melbourne, residing in Georgian Court, Balwyn, in 1956. She was educated at Ruyton Girls' School Kew and then enrolled at RMIT.

Durham at first planned to be a pianist and gained the qualification of Associate in Music, Australia (AMusA), in classical piano at the University of Melbourne Conservatorium. She had some professional engagements playing piano and also had classical vocal training and performed blues, gospel and jazz pieces. Her singing career began one night at the age of 18 when she asked Nicholas Ribush, leader of the Melbourne University Jazz Band, at the Memphis Jazz Club in Malvern, whether she could sing with the band. In 1963, she began performing at the same club with Frank Traynor's Jazz Preachers, using her mother's maiden name of Durham. In that year she also recorded her first EP, Judy Durham, with Frank Traynor's Jazz Preachers for W&G Records.

The Seekers

The Seekers consisted of Durham, Athol Guy, Bruce Woodley and Keith Potger, an ABC radio producer. Through Potger's position the three were able to make a demo tape in their spare time. This was given to W&G Records, which wanted another sample of Durham's voice before agreeing to record a Jazz Preachers' album. W&G instead signed the Seekers for an album, Introducing the Seekers, in 1963. Durham, however, recorded two other songs with the Jazz Preachers, "Muddy Water" (which appeared on their album Jazz from the Pulpit) and "Trombone Frankie" (an adapted version of Bessie Smith's "Trombone Cholly").

In early 1964, the Seekers sailed to the United Kingdom on SS Fairsky on which the group provided the musical entertainment. Originally they had planned to return after ten weeks, but they received a steady stream of bookings through the Grade Agency because they had sent the agency a copy of their first album. On 4 November 1964 at EMI's Abbey Road Studios, the Seekers recorded "I'll Never Find Another You". In February 1965, the song reached number one in the UK and Australia. The group had further Top 10 hits with "A World of Our Own", "Morningtown Ride" and "Someday, One Day". "Georgy Girl" reached number two (Billboard chart) and number one (Cashbox chart) in the United States. "The Carnival Is Over" is still one of the top 50 best-selling singles in the UK.

On 12 March 1967, the Seekers set an official all-time Australian record when more than 200,000 people (nearly one tenth of the city's entire population at that time) flocked to their performance at the Sidney Myer Music Bowl in Melbourne, Australia. Their TV special The Seekers Down Under scored the biggest TV audience ever (with a 67 rating), and early in 1968 they were all awarded the nation's top honour as "Australians of the Year 1967". On a tour of New Zealand in February 1968, Durham advised the group that she was leaving the Seekers and left in July 1968.

Solo career

Durham returned to Australia in August 1968 and her first solo television special, An Evening with Judith Durham, screened on the Nine Network in September. During her solo career, she released albums titled For Christmas with Love, Gift of Song and Climb Ev'ry Mountain. In 1970, she made the television special Meet Judith Durham in London, ending with her rendition of "When You Come to the End of a Perfect Day" by Carrie Jacobs-Bond (1862–1946).

In 1975, Durham starred in an acting and singing role as Sarah Simmonds, a burlesque type performer in "The Golden Girl", an episode of the Australian television series Cash and Co. Set in the 1800s Australian goldfields, the episode also featured Durham's husband, Ron Edgeworth, on piano. She performed six songs; "Oh Susanna", "When Starlight Fades", "Maggie Mae", "Rock of Ages", "There's No Place Like Home" and "The Lord Is My Shepherd".

Durham staged a series of concerts at The Troubadour, Melbourne in 1987 with Edgeworth, performing originals the two had written. They returned again the following year.

In January 1992, Durham released "Australia Land of Today" which peaked at number 124 on the ARIA charts." 

In 2003, Durham toured the UK in "The Diamond Tour" celebrating her 60th birthday. The tour included the Royal Festival Hall and a CD and DVD of the concert was issued.

In 2006, Durham started modernising the music and phrases of "Advance Australia Fair". the Australian National Anthem; the Aboriginal singer/songwriter Kutcha Edwards also contributed lyrics, Durham first performed it in May 2009 at Federation Hall, St Kilda Road. It was released as a CD single.

Durham recorded The Australian Cities Suite album with all proceeds to go to the charitable sector. The album was released in October 2008. This project was to benefit charities working with the Lord Mayor's Charitable Fund, including Orchestra Victoria and the Motor Neurone Disease Association of Australia (Durham was national patron).

On 13 February 2009, Durham made a surprise return to the Myer Music Bowl when she performed the closing number at the RocKwiz Salutes the Bowl – Sidney Myer Music Bowl 50th Anniversary with "The Carnival Is Over". On 23 May 2009, she performed a one-hour 'a cappella' concert in Melbourne as a launch for her album Up Close and Personal.

In October 2011, Durham signed an exclusive international deal with Decca Records. George Ash, president of Universal Music Australasia, said that "It is an honour to have Judith Durham join Decca's wonderful roster of artists. When you think of the legends that have graced the Decca Records catalogue it is the perfect home to welcome Judith to, and we couldn't be more excited to work with Judith on not only her new recordings but her incredible catalogue as well."

In June 2018, to celebrate Durham's 75th birthday, a collection of 14 previously unreleased songs was released on the album So Much More.

Personal life
On 21 November 1969, Durham married her musical director, British pianist Ron Edgeworth, at Scots' Church in Melbourne. Edgeworth had been with a group, The Trebletones, on the same tour. They chose not to have children.  Durham and her husband were vegetarian; she became a vegan after 2015.  She also avoided alcohol and caffeine.

They lived in the UK and Switzerland until the mid-1980s when they bought property in Nambour, Queensland. In 1990, Durham, Edgeworth and their tour manager, Peter Summers, were involved in a car accident on the Calder Freeway. The driver of the other car died at the scene and Durham sustained a fractured wrist and leg. The response from her fans made Durham consider getting back together with the other members of the Seekers for a silver jubilee show. During this reunion Edgeworth was diagnosed with motor neurone disease also known as ALS. He died on 10 December 1994 with Durham by his side.

In the late 1990s, Durham was stalked by a former president of a Judith Durham fan club, a woman who sent her dozens of doormats through the post. The woman was subsequently prosecuted and was later imprisoned for other serial crimes.

In 2000, Durham broke her hip and was unable to sing "The Carnival Is Over" at the closing ceremony of the 2000 Olympic Games in Sydney with the Seekers. However, she sang it from a wheelchair at the 2000 Paralympics shortly thereafter.

In May 2013, during the Seekers' Golden Jubilee tour, Durham suffered a stroke that diminished her ability to read and write—both visual language and musical scores. During her convalescence, she made progress to rebuild those skills. Her singing ability was not affected by the stroke.

Death
Durham was born with asthma and at age four she caught measles, which left her with a life-long chronic lung disease, bronchiectasis. Durham died from the disease at the Alfred Hospital in Melbourne on 5 August 2022, at age 79. She was given a state memorial service by the state of Victoria on 6 September 2022 at Hamer Hall.
Durham is interred with her husband Ron Edgeworth at Springvale Botanical Cemetery,
Springvale.

Solo releases

Studio albums

Live albums

Compilation albums

Extended plays

Charting singles

Honours and awards
 In 1966, the Seekers (Judith Durham, Athol Guy, Bruce Woodley, Keith Potger) received the Carl Alan Award for Best New Group (1965) at the Top Of The Pops Awards, in London.
In 1968, Durham and the other members of The Seekers were named jointly and severally Australians of the Year 1967.
In the 1995 Australia Day Honours, Durham, along with the other members of The Seekers, was awarded the Medal of the Order of Australia (OAM).
 In 2001, Durham was awarded the Centenary Medal by the Governor-General for valued service to Australian society through music.
In 2003, Rotary International invested Durham as a Paul Harris Fellow, in recognition of her extensive work on behalf of charities.
In 2006, Durham and the other members of The Seekers were presented with the Key to the City by Melbourne's Lord Mayor, John So.
In 2012, Durham and the other members of the Seekers were honoured by Australia Post with a special Legends Of Australian Music postage stamp.
In the 2014 Queen's Birthday Honours, Durham, along with the other members of The Seekers, was advanced as an Officer of the Order of Australia (AO).
In 2015, Durham was named 2015 Victorian of the Year.

ARIA Music Awards
The ARIA Music Awards are a set of annual ceremonies presented by Australian Recording Industry Association (ARIA), which recognise excellence, innovation, and achievement across all genres of the music of Australia. They commenced in 1987. At the 2022 ARIA Music Awards a special tribute in her honour will have "I'll Never Find Another You" performed by Casey Donovan and "The Carnival Is Over" by Dami Im.

|-
|1995 || Judith Durham (and the Seekers) || Hall of Fame || 
|-

APRA Awards 
These annual awards were established by Australasian Performing Right Association (APRA) in 1982 to honour the achievements of songwriters and music composers and to recognise their song writing skills, sales and airplay performance, by its members annually.

|-
| 2013 || Judith Durham (and the Seekers) || Ted Albert Award for Outstanding Services to Australian Music || 
|-

Australian Women in Music Awards
The Australian Women in Music Awards is an annual event that celebrates outstanding women in the Australian Music Industry who have made significant and lasting contributions in their chosen field. They commenced in 2018.

|-
| 2019
| Judith Durham
| AWMA Honour Roll
|

Music Victoria Awards
The Music Victoria Awards are an annual awards night celebrating Victorian music. They commenced in 2005.

|-
| 2015 || Judith Durham (and the Seekers) || Hall of Fame || 
|-

References

Sources

External links

Official website
Discography
 
The Seekers at the Milesago website

1943 births
2022 deaths
20th-century Australian pianists
20th-century Australian women singers
21st-century pianists
A&M Records artists
Australian expatriates in Switzerland
Australian expatriates in the United Kingdom
Australian jazz singers
Australian sopranos
Australian women pianists
Australian women pop singers
Australian women singer-songwriters
Columbia Records artists
Deaths from lung disease
Decca Records artists
EMI Records artists
Officers of the Order of Australia
People educated at Ruyton Girls' School
People from Essendon, Victoria
Pye Records artists
Recipients of the Centenary Medal
Recipients of the Medal of the Order of Australia
RMIT University alumni
Singers from Melbourne
Tambourine players
The Seekers members
University of Melbourne alumni
University of Melbourne women
20th-century women pianists
21st-century women pianists
Musicians from Melbourne